Piccioli is an Italian surname. Notable people with the surname include:

Fernandino Maria Piccioli (1821–1900), Italian entomologist
Gianfranco Piccioli (born 1944), Italian film director, producer and screenwriter
Luigi Piccioli (1812–1862), Italian musician and singer
Pierpaolo Piccioli (born 1967), Italian fashion designer

Italian-language surnames